Leucocoprinus tropicus is a species of mushroom producing fungus in the family Agaricaceae.

Taxonomy 
It was first described in 1982 by the Indian mycologists K.V. Natarajan and B. Manjula who classified it as Leucocoprinus tropicus.

Description 
Leucocoprinus tropicus is a dapperling mushroom with thin whitish-yellow flesh.

Cap: 6.5-7cm wide, flattened convex and depressing with maturity. The surface is white with a brownish umbo and loose brown scales scattered across the surface which may disappear with age. There are striations at the cap edges. Gills: Free, crowded and white. Stem: 9-10 cm tall and 5-8mm thick without a noticeably thicker base or any tapering. The surface is white and the interior hollow and white mycelium may be present at the base. The persistent, membranous stem ring is white and located towards the top of the stem (superior). Spore print: White. Spores: Ellipsoid with a germ pore. 8.8-13.2 x 5.5-7.7 μm.

Habitat and distribution 
L. tropicus is scarcely recorded and little known. The specimens studied by Natarajan and Manjula were found growing on soil at Raj Bhavan in Tamil Nadu, India in November 1978.

Etymology 
The specific epithet tropicus derives from the Greek tropikós meaning tropical.

References 

Leucocoprinus
Fungi described in 1982
Fungi of India